BRM may refer to:

Business
 Business reference model
 Business relationship management, a formal approach to understanding, defining, and supporting inter-business activities
 Business reply mail, a term for freepost in some countries

Sport
 Brevet Randonneurs Mondiaux, long distance endurance cycling events sanctioned by the Audax Club Parisien
 British Racing Motors, former British Formula One motor racing team
 Team BRM, Australian motor racing team

Other uses
 Ballot Resolution Meeting, an International Organization for Standardization (ISO) procedure
 Biological response modifiers, substances that alter immune response
 British Railway Modelling, a British hobby magazine
 Jacinto Lara International Airport, Barquisimeto, Venezuela (by IATA code)
 BRM-1, a military vehicle